Herreshoff may refer to:

 Herreshoff (surname), a German surname
 Herreshoff (automobile), any of three models of automobile built by the U.S. manufacturer Herreshoff Motor Company, 1909–14
 Herreshoff Bull's Eye
 Herreshoff Castle, an unusual residence in Marblehead, Massachusetts
 Herreshoff family
 Herreshoff Marine Museum
 USS Herreshoff No. 306 (SP-1841)
 USS Herreshoff No. 308 (SP-2232)
 USS Herreshoff No. 309 (SP-1218)
 USS Herreshoff No. 321 (SP-2235)
 USS Herreshoff No. 322 (SP-2373)
 USS Herreshoff No. 323 (SP-2840)
 Herreshoff 31
 Herreshoff 12½